Kurt Hiller (17 August 1885, Berlin – 1 October 1972, Hamburg) was a German essayist, lawyer, and expressionist poet. He was also a political (namely pacifist) journalist. 

Hiller came from a middle-class Jewish background. A communist, he was deeply influenced by Immanuel Kant and Arthur Schopenhauer, despising the philosophy of G. W. F. Hegel, which made him quite unpopular with Marxists. 

Hiller was also an influential writer in the early German gay rights movement in the first two decades of the 20th century. Hiller was elected as vice-chairman of the Scientific Humanitarian Committee in 1929. In 1929 he took over as chairman from fellow gay activist Magnus Hirschfeld. Like Hirschfeld, he had affairs with men but did not publicly identify himself as homosexual.

He is remembered, too, for his book §175: Schmach des Jahrhunderts (Paragraph 175: Outrage of the Century) published in 1922. Hiller maintained that if homosexuals wanted change, they would have to effect it themselves. Hiller was arrested by the Gestapo in March 1933 following the Nazi seizure of power and was severely beaten before his release in August 1933. He spent nine months in prisons and in the earliest concentration camps, being transferred to Columbia-Hauss, Brandenburg and Oranienburg concentration camp. He was released in April 1934.

He fled to Prague immediately after his release, and met his partner  (a member of the Social Democratic Party of Germany) there while in exile. He later left Prague for London in 1938. In 1955, he returned to West Germany, shortly after which he tried and failed to reestablish the Scientific Humanitarian Committee. In the 1960s, he began formulating another attempt to petition against Paragraph 175, but did not complete it. He lived and wrote in Hamburg until his death in 1972. As a renowned and prominent gay activist from the beginning of the century to his death he was connected with many other activists of the first homosexual movement such as Magnus Hirschfeld, Eva Siewert and many more.

References

Further reading

External links

Biography
Kurt Hiller: A 1928 Gay Rights Speech

1885 births
1972 deaths
German gay writers
German political writers
German male non-fiction writers
German Peace Society members
Homosexual concentration camp survivors
Jewish emigrants from Nazi Germany to the United Kingdom
Jewish pacifists
Jewish socialists
LGBT Jews
German LGBT journalists
German LGBT rights activists
Male journalists
People convicted under Germany's Paragraph 175
Writers from Berlin
20th-century German journalists